Anthea Mary Fraser (born 1930) is a British novelist, known for her mystery thrillers.  Her mother was a published novelist and Anthea began composing poems and stories before she could write.  At the age of five she announced that she wanted to be an author.  However, despite having been a prolific writer in school, she did not become a professional writer until after her two daughters were born.

Her first professional publications were short stories.  Her first novel was published in 1970.  Her first significant success was with her 1974 novel Laura Possessed, which had a paranormal theme, and was followed by 6 other similarly themed novels.  She then wrote some romantic suspense stories before turning to writing crime fiction.

She has created two mystery novel series, the first featuring 'Detective Chief Inspector David Webb' with the Shillingham police.  There are 16 novels in this series, the last twelve of which bear titles based on the lyrics to the traditional English folk song Green Grow the Rushes, O.

The second series features 'Rona Parish', a biographer and freelance journalist.

Anthea Fraser served as secretary of the Crime Writers' Association from 1986 to 1996.  She has also published five novels under the pen name 'Vanessa Graham'.

Novels

 Designs of Annabelle, 1971
 In the Balance, 1973 (short story)
 Laura Possessed:  A Novel of Suspense, 1974
 Home Through the Dark, 1974
 Whistler’s Lane:  A Novel of Suspense, 1975
 Breath of Brimstone, 1977
 Presence of Mind, 1978
 Island-in-Waiting, 1979
 The Stone, 1980
 The Cavalier Case, 1991
 The Macbeth Prophecy, 1995
 Motive for Murder, 1996
 Dangerous Deception, 1998
 Past Shadows, 2001
 Fathers and Daughters, 2002
 Thicker than Water, 2009
 Shifting Sands, 2011
 the Unburied Past, 2013
 A Tangled Thread, 2015
 Sins of the Fathers, 2018

Novels featuring DCI David Webb
 A Shroud for Delilah, 1984
 A Necessary End, 1985
 Pretty Maids All in a Row, 1986
 Death Speaks Softly, 1987
 The Nine Bright Shiners, 1987
 Six Proud Walkers, 1988
 The April Rainers, 1989
 Symbols at Your Door, 1990
 The Lily-White Boys (Also published as I'll Sing You Two-O), 1991
 Three, Three the Rivals, 1992
 The Gospel Makers, 1994
 The Seven Stars, 1995
 One Is One and All Alone, 1996
 The Ten Commandments, 1997
 Eleven That Went Up to Heaven, 1999
 The Twelve Apostles, 1999

Novels featuring Rona Parish
 Brought to Book, 2003
 Jigsaw, 2004
 Person or Persons Unknown, 2005
 A Family Concern, 2006
 Rogue in Porcelain, 2007
 Next Door to Murder, 2008
 Unfinished Portrait, 2010
 A Question of Identity, 2012
 Justice Postponed, 2014
 Retribution, 2016

Novels written under the pen name 'Vanessa Graham'
 In the Balance, 1973
 Time on Trial, 1979
 Second Time Around, 1982
 The Stand-In, 1984
 Such Men Are Dangerous, 1988

References

External links
 TW Books profile
 Fantastic Fiction profile
 booksnbytes profile

1930 births
English crime fiction writers
Living people
English women novelists
Women mystery writers